The Chapel of St. Paul is a Roman Catholic parish church under the authority of the Roman Catholic Archdiocese of New York, located in Staatsburg, Dutchess County, New York. It was established in 1887. It is a mission chapel of Church of Regina Coeli in Hyde Park.

History
The first Roman Catholic church in Staatsburgh was a stone structure built in 1849 by Rev. Michael J. Riordan, pastor of St. Peter's, Poughkeepsie, on Clay Hill, on land owned by William Emmett, cousin of New York Attorney General Thomas Addis Emmet.  It was served but Father Augustine P. Anderson, O.P., who also visited stations in Ulster and Sullivan counties. However, Father Anderson left for California in 1850.

This church was about two miles from Staatsburg, so a more convenient site was chosen at Staatsburgh, where St. Paul's was built in 1853. The first pastor was Rev. Michael J. Scully. St. Paul's operated as a mission church of St. Joseph's Chapel (Rhinecliff, New York), where Father Scully resided. It subsequently became a mission of Regina Coeli in Hyde Park and remains so.

References 

Religious organizations established in 1887
Roman Catholic churches in New York (state)
Churches in Dutchess County, New York
1887 establishments in New York (state)
Roman Catholic churches completed in 1849
19th-century Roman Catholic church buildings in the United States